This is a list of synagogues in Uruguay.

Montevideo
Sephardic Jewish Community 
Uruguayan Jewish Community
New Jewish Congregation
Vaad Ha'ir 
Yavne
Beit Jabad
Adat Israel
Anshei Yeshurun
Pocitos Sephardic Temple

Punta del Este
The main seaside resort on the Atlantic has a rich Jewish religious life, with three synagogues:
Rafael Temple
Beit Yaacov 
Beit Jabad

Paysandú
Sociedad Israelita de Paysandú

See also

History of the Jews in Uruguay

References

 
Synagogues
Uruguay